Wether Down is one of the highest hills in the county of Hampshire, England, and in the South Downs, rising to  above sea level.

Wether Hill is largely treeless and there is a trig point and transmission mast at the summit. Cross dykes and a long barrow in the vicinity provide evidence of prehistoric settlement in the area.

References 

Hills of Hampshire